April 2015

See also

References

 04
April 2015 events in the United States